The 1993–94 Scottish Cup was the 109th staging of Scotland's most prestigious football knockout competition. The Cup was won by Dundee United who defeated Rangers in the final.

First round

Replays

Second round

Third round

Replays

Fourth round

Replays

Quarter-finals

Replays

Semi-finals

Replays

Final

See also
1993–94 in Scottish football
1993–94 Scottish League Cup

Scottish Cup seasons
Scottish Cup, 1993-94
Scot